Posht Band may refer to:
 Posht Band, Hormozgan